Szaniec  is a village in the administrative district of Gmina Busko-Zdrój, within Busko County, Świętokrzyskie Voivodeship, in south-central Poland.

The village has an approximate population of 770. It gives its name to the protected area called  Szaniec Landscape Park.

References

Villages in Busko County